The Christian is a 1911 Australian silent film starring Roy Redgrave and Eugenie Duggan. It was the first film directed by Franklyn Barrett. The film was based on Hall Caine's play adapted from his novel The Christian which was published in 1897 and the first British novel to sell one million copies. It is considered a lost film.

Plot
Clergyman John Storm is doing mission work in the slums of London when he meets Glory, a girl from the country, who has been persuaded by Lord Robert Ure to seek a career on the stage. Storm tries to persuade Glory not to do it but she refuses. He then asks Lord Ure, which so infuriates him he sends someone to burn down Storm's mission hall. Storm is unconscious inside but he is rescued at the last minute. He goes to see Glory, determined to save her soul, by killing her if need be. But he comes to his senses and the two of them are married.

Cast
Roy Redgrave as John Storm
Rutland Beckett as Lord Robert Ure
Eugenie Duggan as Glory Quayle
Olive Wilton as Polly Love
Marie D'Alton as Lady Robert Ure
Lily Bryer as Mrs James Callender
Alfred Harford as Lord Storm
Edmund Duggan as Father Enderby
Fred Kehoe as Parson Quayle
Bert Bailey as Archdeacon Wealthy
George Kensington as Brother Paul
Max Clifton as Horatio Drake
Gus Franks as Mr Jupe
Mabs Howth as Liza

Production
The film is based on a popular play that had been recently been produced in Sydney by William Anderson in September 1911. Roy Redgrave had played the role of John Storm in England for two years prior to coming to Australia.

Indoor scenes were shot at Wonderland in Bondi, which was owned by Anderson.

Shooting also appears to have taken place at West's studios, which were on top of their headquarters in Pitt Street, Sydney.

Roy Redgrave later claimed that he produced the picture:
I had a very strenuous time producing this picture, as I had also to play John Storm, the while I was telling the members who were acting in the scenes what to do. All the time I was doing this I thought that when The Christian was thrown upon the white screen John Storm would be mistaken for a ventriloquist. It turned out to the satisfaction of all concerned.

Redgrave would revive the role on stage throughout the rest of his career.

Later Versions
There were other film versions of the play in 1914 (from Hollywood), 1915 (from England) and 1923 (from Hollywood).

References

External links

Original story of The Christian by Hall Caine
The Christian at National Film and Sound Archive

1911 films
Australian drama films
Australian silent feature films
Australian black-and-white films
Lost Australian films
1911 drama films
Films based on multiple works
Films based on British novels
Australian films based on plays
Films set in England
1911 lost films
Lost drama films
Films directed by Franklyn Barrett
Silent drama films